Haluvalli is a village in Chikmagalur district, Karnataka, India.  and is located on the banks of the river Bhadra. Haluvalli lies 87 Kilometres South-west of Chickmagalur

Demographics
Per the 2011 Census of India, Haluvalli had a total population of 348; of whom 174 are male and an equal number female.

How to reach
5 Kilometers from Kalasa, 10 Kilometer from Horanadu

Plenty of KSRTC buses from Bengaluru to Horandu which connects to Haluvalli.

Places to see
 Shri Subrahmanyeshwara swamy temple 
 Bhadra River 
 Bhadra River Bridge 
 Abbi Falls (Haluvalli-Horanadu Road) 
 Eduruvare Gudda 
 Aane Gudda (Also known as Kurne Gudda)

References

Villages in Chikkamagaluru district